Panzani Ferrety Sousa (born 25 December 1990) is a Congolese professional footballer who plays as a midfielder for Sacramento Republic FC in the USL Championship.

Career 
Born in Democratic Republic of the Congo, Sousa grew up in Raleigh, North Carolina and began his career with the RailHawks organization, helping lead their U-23 team to a USASA national championship in 2011.

Ferrety played on his first professional club with French side FCM Aubervilliers for two seasons.

Ferrety signed a contract with the Atlanta Silverbacks in 2013, but didn't make his debut for the club until May 3, 2014 against Ottawa Fury FC at Atlanta Silverbacks Park. Sousa was subbed in at the 83rd minute and was cautioned with a yellow card six minutes later.

On 25 January 2022, Sousa signed with the USL Championship's Sacramento Republic.

References

External links 
 

1990 births
Living people
Soccer players from Raleigh, North Carolina
Soccer players from North Carolina
Association football midfielders
Democratic Republic of the Congo footballers
Democratic Republic of the Congo expatriate footballers
Atlanta Silverbacks players
Wilmington Hammerheads FC players
North American Soccer League players
USL Championship players
Las Vegas Lights FC players
FCM Aubervilliers players
Union Omaha players
North Carolina FC U23 players
Sacramento Republic FC players
Democratic Republic of the Congo expatriate sportspeople in the United States
Democratic Republic of the Congo expatriate sportspeople in France
Expatriate soccer players in the United States
Expatriate footballers in France